Garmo, De Garmo or DeGarmo may refer to:

 Charles De Garmo (1849–1934), American educator, education theorist and college president
 Diana DeGarmo (born 1987), singer, songwriter and a Broadway and television actress
 Torgeir Garmo (born 1941), Norwegian politician for the Liberal Party
 Mary deGarmo Bryan (1891-1986), American dietitian, college professor
 Mount Garmo, mountain peak in Tajikistan